"Helix the Cat" is a science fantasy short story by American writer Theodore Sturgeon.  The story was written in 1939 or 1940 and submitted to John W. Campbell, editor of Unknown  and Astounding Science Fiction magazines. The editor rejected it, as he felt it did not fit into either fantasy or science fiction categories.

The manuscript was placed in storage, thought lost by the author, and returned to him  about thirty years later. It was published, without any alterations, in Astounding: The John W Campbell Memorial Anthology, in 1973.

Plot summary

The story is narrated by Pete Tronti, a struggling inventor.  Whilst experimenting with a new form of glass, he is trying to perfect, Pete is astonished to hear a disembodied voice from within the bottle he is working with. The voice announces itself to be the soul of Wallace Gregory, who has just died in a road accident. He is hiding from Them, who search out and eat souls.

Gregory persuades Tronti to create a body for him and eventually he takes possession of the body of Helix, Tronti's pet cat. Between them, they  modify Helix's body and increase his intelligence. But when Helix/Gregory start to take over Tronti's life, he decides he has no option but to kill the cat. Helix escapes and goes into business as a cat burglar.

1973 short stories
Short stories by Theodore Sturgeon